Code of the Clans is a field guide in the Warriors novel series. Code of the Clans is about the warrior code that guides the Clans in their everyday behavior and decisions.

Plot summary
In the introduction, the book summarizes how the Clans were formed. The next chapter features Leafpool explaining the warrior code to the reader, through the point of view of curious loners visiting the Clans. Leafpool tells a story about each code, which illustrates how and why the code came to be.

Code one: Defend your Clan, even with your life. You may have friendships with cats from other Clans, but your loyalty must remain to your Clan, as one day you may meet them in battle. Code one tells the story of Cloudberry of RiverClan and Ryewhisker of WindClan. Cloudberry is expecting Ryewhisker's kits and Ryewhisker believes the kits will end the territorial dispute between the two Clans. But instead, in a battle, Ryewhisker is killed trying to defend Cloudberry from his Clanmates. This leads to the creation of the first code.

Code two: Do not hunt or trespass on another Clan's territory. The story begins at the gathering when Brindlestar, leader of ShadowClan, complains about ThunderClan. ThunderClan accuses ShadowClan of stealing prey, and a fight starts to break out. The fight was interrupted when a branch falls between the two squabbling Clans to separate them, and no cats are hurt. It was a sign from StarClan, and it prompted the Clans to decide that no Clan cat may cross the border for leisure or hunting. (In a mini-story, White-eye and Dappletail try to catch a fish.)

Code three: Elders, queens, sick or injured cats and kits must be fed before apprentices and warriors. Unless they have permission, apprentices may not eat until they have hunted to feed the elders. Code three tells the story of Splashheart of RiverClan in a battle against ThunderClan for Sunningrocks. Splashheart is guided by a StarClan cat and RiverClan wins Sunningrocks. They celebrate by feeding the elders and kits, and StarClan hints that Splashheart will become leader of RiverClan one day. (In a mini-story, Longtail and Darkstripe go out hunting for the elders, but Darkstripe eats the fresh-kill intended for Poppydawn, a sick elder. Poppydawn dies from greencough, something she could have fought off if she had been well-fed, and Longtail regrets not speaking up.)

Code four: Prey is killed only to be eaten. Give thanks to StarClan for its life. The story starts when Driftkit and Fallowkit of ShadowClan play with fresh-kill. They are scolded by their leader, the deputy, and their mother. An owl then swoops into the camp and snatches the fresh-kill away. Lilystar says it is a sign from StarClan, and declares the fourth code.

Code five: A kit must be at least six moons old to become an apprentice. The story begins with a WindClan queen named Daisytail worrying that her son is too young to be in a battle. She and a queen from ShadowClan stop a battle and tell their leaders that their apprentices should still be kits until they are at least six moons old. (In a mini-story, during the battle to drive out WindClan, Flintfang watches as his apprentice, Badgerfang, (who is three moons old) dies.)

Code six: Newly appointed warriors will keep a silent vigil for one night after receiving their warrior name. The story starts with RiverClan's medicine cat, Meadowpelt, overhearing that some of the new warriors are going to try to jump the gorge on the full moon, as yet another one of their dangerous escapades. Meadowpelt goes to StarClan for answers, and is told that warriors should stand a silent vigil during their first night as warrior, in order to think about being a warrior. The new warriors are forced to sit a silent vigil, and because they are silent, they hear a fox attempting to break into the nursery, and are able to chase it off. (Squirrelflight tells us what do at a vigil in a mini-story.)

Code seven: A cat cannot be made deputy without having mentored at least one apprentice. Code seven tells the tale of Acorntail, who is chosen as deputy for WindClan. However, he keeps messing up on his duties, and tells Featherstar that she must choose a different deputy. Featherstar realizes that Acorntail hasn't had an apprentice, so he doesn't have leadership skills yet. Acorntail is then willingly demoted, and he is promised an apprentice to train in the future.

Code eight: The deputy will become Clan leader when the leader dies, retires, or is exiled. The story starts when Beechstar, leader of SkyClan, dies at the claws of a RiverClan warrior, and passes on the position of leader to his son, Mothpelt. Mothpelt wishes to avenge his father's death and leads an attack to RiverClan. However, the river was swollen due to a rainfall, and Robinwing and Maplewhisker, the deputy, have to save the Mothpelt from drowning. Mothpelt then decides to give up his position to Maplewhisker and form a new code. (In a mini-story, Tallstar talks to Bluestar about his choice in making Onewhisker deputy.)

Code nine: After the death, retirement, promotion (to a leader status), or exile of the deputy, the new deputy must be chosen before moonhigh. The story begins when the ShadowClan deputy dies from greencough soon after their leader died, leaving ShadowClan without someone to take the place of leader. Jumpfoot and Mossfire both want to be leader, so they fight each other for the position, which kills both of them. Redscar, the Clan's medicine cat, turns to StarClan for the answer. They tell him they must choose a new leader, and that the leader must choose a new deputy immediately after the old one cannot be deputy. Redscar chooses Flowerstem, Mossfire's sister.

Code ten: A Gathering of all four Clans is held at the full moon during a truce that lasts for the night. There shall be no fighting among Clans at this time. The story starts at a Gathering. All four Clans were attacked by ShadowClan, led by Ripplestar. As Ripplestar attacks Finchstar, leader of ThunderClan, StarClan sends clouds over the moon and kills Ripplestar with a bolt of lightning - a sign to all the Clans that fighting at a Gathering is wrong.

Code eleven: Boundaries must be checked and marked daily. Challenge all trespassing cats. The story begins when a SkyClan warrior named Poppycloud and her apprentice accidentally overstep the ThunderClan border and are caught. The leader of ThunderClan goes to the SkyClan leader to complain. Poppycloud explains that they could not smell the border because it was not freshly marked, which ultimately leads to the decision for Clans to mark their borders daily. (In a mini-story, Whitestorm teaches Firepaw, Graypaw, Ravenpaw, Sandpaw, and Dustpaw about border tactics.)

Code twelve: No warrior can neglect a kit in pain or danger, even if the kit is from a different Clan. The story begins when the RiverClan medicine cat, Graywing, and a couple of warriors see WindClan kits fall into the gorge. Graywing says that it is only WindClan's loss and there is nothing they can do. Later that night, the kits, now dead and spirits in StarClan, come to Graywing in a dream, and tell her the importance of kits in a Clan. The next day, Graywing takes the kits' bodies out of the gorge and buries them. (In a mini-story, Tigerkit (Tigerstar) is saved by a couple of warriors from ShadowClan from a fox.)

Code thirteen: The word of the Clan leader is the warrior code. The story starts at the Gathering, where Darkstar, leader of SkyClan, gives a huge piece of territory to ThunderClan. His deputy, Raincloud, speaks out at the Gathering and tells him that he is wrong to do that. Darkstar then proposes a new code, to prevent leaders from being embarrassed by their warriors. (In a mini-story, Cloudstar speaks about a broken promise.)

Code fourteen: An honorable warrior does not need to kill other cats to win their battles, unless they are outside the warrior code or if it is necessary for self-defense. The story starts with the ShadowClan medicine cat, Mossheart, watching her Clanmates die in a battle skirmish. She and the other Clan medicine cats go to Moonstone together and are told that the unnecessary death must stop.

Code fifteen: A warrior rejects the soft life of a kittypet. The story starts with Lionpaw following Pinestar to the Twoleg border. Lionpaw sees Pinestar interacting with a Twoleg. When Pinestar returns and catches Lionpaw, he tells Lionpaw that he was on a secret mission, and that what Lionpaw saw is absolutely confidential and he must not tell other cats. However, Lionpaw soon finds out that Pinestar wishes to live with Twolegs and Lionpaw pushes him to tell the Clan this. Pinestar thanks him and tells him that his future name will be Lionheart. (In a mini-story, Sandstorm speaks about her thoughts on Fireheart.)

In the conclusion of the book, Leafpool speaks of failed proposals for the warrior code.

The cover shows (from left to right) Blackstar, Firestar, Tallstar, and Leopardstar. Below them, they are surrounded by a group of cats, so the picture presumably depicts a Gathering.

Errors

 It states that the Clans made a decision to make a Gathering place and start the codes one by one. However, in Secrets of the Clans, it was said that StarClan created the warrior code and instated Gatherings at the very beginning of the time of the Clans.
 In Secrets of the Clans it was said that the Clans began when they were told by the dead cats to congregate, whereas in Code of the Clans it says the Clans were created when cats peacefully gathered wherever they were interested.
 At one point, Longtail is accidentally called Longstripe, possibly being confused with Darkstripe.
 Squirrelflight tells us about her vigil, though she never sat vigil (see Starlight).

Publication History 
 Code of the Clans (EN), HarperCollins (hardcover), 9 June 2009
 Code of the Clans (EN), HarperCollins (e-book), 9 June 2009
 Das Gesetz der Krieger (DE), Beltz & Gelberg (hardcover), 30 July 2011, translated by Friederike Levin
 Das Gesetz der Krieger (DE), Beltz & Gelberg (audio-book), 26 July 2011, translated by Friederike Levin and read by Marlen Diekhoff
 Закон племён (RU), OLMA Media Group (hardcover), 2013, translator unknown
 Das Gesetz der Krieger (DE), Beltz & Gelberg (paperback), 1 December 2016, translated by Friederike Levin and read by Marlen Diekhoff
 Das Gesetz der Krieger (DE), Beltz & Gelberg (abridge audio-book), 21 February 2017, translated by Friederike Levin and read by Marlen Diekhoff
 Klaanien laki (FI), Art House (hardcover), 25 July 2019, translated by Nana Sironen

References

Warriors (novel series)
HarperCollins books
2009 American novels
2009 children's books
Novels about cats